Eremophila physocalyx is a flowering plant in the figwort family, Scrophulariaceae and is endemic to Western Australia. It is an erect shrub with soft, grey-green leaves and cream-coloured flowers with unusual inflated sepals.

Description
There is a raised mid-vein on the lower surface.

There are 5 green to reddish-brown, somewhat inflated sepals, which are  but which enlarge after flowering. They are glabrous on the outer surface but there are branched hairs on the margins and near the ends of the inner surface. The petal tube is cream-coloured, faintly tinged lilac and mostly glabrous except that the inside of the tube is filled with long, soft hairs. The 4 stamens are fully enclosed in the petal tube.

Taxonomy and naming 
This species was first formally described by Robert Chinnock in 2007 and the description was published in Eremophila and Allied Genera: A Monograph of the Plant Family Myoporaceae. The specific epithet (physocalyx) is derived from the Ancient Greek φῦσα (phûsa) meaning "bellows" and κάλυξ (kálux) meaning "cup" or "outer envelope of a flower", referring to the expanded sepals of this species.

Distribution and habitat
Eremophila physocalyx grows in sandy soil between Mullewa and Woodleigh Station in the Carnarvon, Murchison and Yalgoo biogeographic regions.

Conservation
This eremophila is classified as "Priority Three" by the Western Australian Government Department of Parks and Wildlife meaning that it is poorly known and known from only a few locations but is not under imminent threat.

Use in horticulture
This eremophila has not often been grown in gardens but its large, brown sepals are unusual and the plant has horticultural potential. It is usually propagated by grafting onto Myoporum rootstock and grows best in well-drained soil in a sunny position. It rarely needs watering, even during a long drought and is tolerant of frost but need to be pruned from an early age to keep its shape compact.

References

Eudicots of Western Australia
physocalyx
Endemic flora of Western Australia
Plants described in 2007
Taxa named by Robert Chinnock